The towns and cities of New York's North Country were created by the U.S. state of New York as municipalities in order to give residents more direct say over local government. The North Country consists of Clinton County, Essex County, Franklin County, Jefferson County, Lewis County, and St. Lawrence County. When counties were first formed in 1683 the entire area was theoretically under the jurisdiction of Albany County though actually wilderness inhabited by Native Americans, by 1764 most of the area became effectively controlled by Albany County. The state would sell off this land to settlers and speculators, most notably as part of the Old Military Tract (1786) to veterans of the US Revolutionary War and as Macomb's Purchase (1791) to Alexander Macomb. In 1772 the northern and western portions of Albany County was divided into two counties– Tryon and Charlotte. Tryon encompassed Lewis, Jefferson, and St. Lawrence counties along with the western section of Franklin; Tryon was renamed Montgomery in 1784. Charlotte encompassed Clinton, Essex, and the majority of Franklin County; the name of the county was changed to Washington County in 1784. In 1788 Clinton County was split from Washington, Essex was formed from Clinton in 1799 and Franklin was formed from Clinton in 1808. Montgomery County's North Country area went to Herkimer County on that county's formation in 1791, but western Franklin and eastern St. Lawrence were returned to Montgomery in 1797. In 1798 Lewis, Jefferson, and western St. Lawrence became part of the newly formed Oneida County from Herkimer in 1798, leaving only central St. Lawrence County as part of Herkimer. In 1801 the future St. Lawrence and Franklin counties which were portions of Montgomery, Herkimer, and Oneida were transferred to Clinton County; the next year in 1802 St. Lawrence was formed as a county. In 1805 both Lewis and Jefferson counties were formed from Oneida County.

In 1785, the township of Plattsburgh was formed in Washington County, and the next year all of Washington County was divided into townships, including the formation of Crown Point township which included all of future Essex County while Plattsburgh was expanded to include most of future Clinton County and Franklin counties. Towns in Franklin can all be traced back to Chateaugay, formed in 1799 a descendant of Plattsburgh. All the towns of Jefferson and Lewis counties can be traced back to Whitestown a town formed in Montgomery County in 1788. In 1801, a year before St. Lawrence County was formed the area of the county, which was 10 survey townships, was combined as the town of Lisbon, all towns in the county are descended from Lisbon.

New York experimented with different types of municipalities before settling upon the current format of towns and cities occupying all the land in a county, and all previous forms were transformed into towns (or divided into multiple towns) in 1788 when all of the state of New York was divided into towns. Some early forms of government in earlier years included land patents with some municipal rights, districts, precincts, and boroughs. Though originally intended to be mere “…involuntary subdivisions of the state, constituted for the purpose of the more convenient exercise of governmental functions by the state for the benefit of all its citizens” as defined by the courts in 1916 (Short v. Town of Orange), towns gained home rule powers from the state in 1964, at which time towns became "a municipal corporation comprising the inhabitants within its boundaries, and formed with the purpose of exercising such powers and discharging such duties of local government and administration of public affairs as have been, or, maybe [sic] conferred or imposed upon it by law.”

The following is a timeline showing the creation of the current towns from their predecessors stretching back to the earliest municipal entity over the area. The timelines only represent which town(s) a particular town was created from and does not represent annexations of territory to and from towns that already existed. All municipalities are towns unless otherwise noted as patent, township, borough, district, or city.

Essex County

Notes

Clinton and Franklin counties

Notes

St Lawrence County

Notes
Ten survey townships were created within Oneida, Herkimer, and Montgomery counties in what is today St. Lawrence County, and in 1801 they were combined into one town called Lisbon and made part of Clinton County. In 1802 Lisbon became the county of St Lawrence and three more towns were split from the original Lisbon.

Lewis County

Notes

Jefferson County

Notes

See also
Timeline of town creation in Downstate New York
Timeline of town creation in the Hudson Valley
Timeline of town creation in New York's Capital District
Timeline of town creation in Central New York

References
General
French, John H. (1860).  Gazetteer of the State of New York. R. Pearsall Smith.

Specific

Former municipalities in New York (state)
 
 
History of New York (state)